Dave Wilson (born 30 September 1984) is an English rugby league footballer who has played in the 2000s and 2010s.

Background
Wilson was born in Kingston upon Hull, Humberside.

Career
Wilson started his career at amateur club Skirlaugh A.R.L.F.C. (in Skirlaugh, East Riding of Yorkshire, of the National Conference League), before moving to Hull Kingston Rovers in 2003.

After leaving Hull Kingston Rovers in 2009 he moved to Australia where he has played for several teams including Mackay Magpies.

References

External links
(archived by web.archive.org) Hull KR Website

1984 births
Living people
English rugby league players
Hull Kingston Rovers players
Rugby league props
Rugby league wingers
Rugby league players from Kingston upon Hull